Lagrange brackets are certain expressions closely related to Poisson brackets that were introduced by Joseph Louis Lagrange in 1808–1810 for the purposes of mathematical formulation of classical mechanics, but unlike the Poisson brackets, have fallen out of use.

Definition 
Suppose that (q1, …, qn, p1, …, pn) is a system of canonical coordinates on a phase space. If each of them is expressed as a function of two variables, u and v, then the Lagrange bracket of u and v is defined by the formula

Properties 

 Lagrange brackets do not depend on the system of canonical coordinates (q, p). If (Q,P) = (Q1, …, Qn, P1, …, Pn) is another system of canonical coordinates, so that

is a canonical transformation, then the Lagrange bracket is an invariant of the transformation, in the sense that

 

Therefore, the subscripts indicating the canonical coordinates are often omitted.

 If Ω is the symplectic form on the 2n-dimensional phase space W and u1,…,u2n form a system of coordinates on W, the symplectic form can be written as 

 

where the matrix 

 ::

This matrix is the inverse of the matrix formed by the Poisson brackets

 

of the coordinates u.

 As a corollary of the preceding properties, coordinates (Q1, ..., Qn, P1, …, Pn) on a phase space are canonical if and only if the Lagrange brackets between them have the form

See also 
 Lagrangian mechanics
 Hamiltonian mechanics

References 

 Cornelius Lanczos, The Variational Principles of Mechanics, Dover (1986), .
 Iglesias, Patrick, Les origines du calcul symplectique chez Lagrange [The origins of symplectic calculus in Lagrange's work], L'Enseign. Math. (2) 44 (1998), no. 3-4, 257–277.

External links 

 
 

Bilinear maps
Hamiltonian mechanics